This article is a list of events in the year 2010 in Senegal.

Incumbents
 President: Abdoulaye Wade 
 Prime Minister: Souleymane Ndéné Ndiaye

Events

April
 April 3 - The African Renaissance Monument is inaugurated in the capital of Dakar.
 April 4 - President Wade declares that to celebrate 50 years of independence he will take back all bases occupied by France.

October
 October 5 - President Wade dismisses Samuel Sarr from his role as energy minister following a week of protests over a power cut. Sarr is replaced with Wade's son.

References

 
2010s in Senegal
Years of the 21st century in Senegal
Senegal
Senegal